Centinela Freeman HealthSystem previously operated three hospitals in the West Los Angeles area of California in the United States, collectively known as the Centinela Freeman Regional Medical Center:

 Centinela Campus in Inglewood; formerly known as Centinela Hospital was purchased by Prime Healthcare Services in 2007 and is now operating as Centinela Hospital Medical Center.
 Memorial Campus in Inglewood; formerly known as Daniel Freeman Memorial Hospital had its services consolidated with Centinela Hospital Medical Center and was closed in 2007.
 Marina Campus in Marina del Rey; formerly known as Daniel Freeman Marina Hospital is now operating as Marina Del Rey Hospital, and has been a part of Cedars-Sinai Medical Center's system of healthcare services since 2015.

History
In 2004, Tenet Healthcare transferred the three hospitals to Centinela Freeman HealthSystem, a newly formed regional health care network owned by local physicians, community leaders, investors, and hospital executives.

References

External links
 Official Website

Hospital networks in the United States
Medical and health organizations based in California